James Milliken may refer to:

 James Milliken (academic administrator) (born 1957), chancellor of the University of Texas System
 James B. Milliken (1900–1988), American jurist and politician
 James T. Milliken (1882–1952), American politician and businessman
 James W. Milliken (1848–1908), American businessman and politician

See also

 James Millikin Bevans (1899–1977), major general in the United States Air Force
 James Millican (1911–1955), American actor
 James Milligan (born 1978), Australian politician
 Jamie Milligan (born 1980), English footballer
 James Millikin (1827–1909), founder of Millikin University